The Central neighborhood (part of the larger Powderhorn community) of Minneapolis, Minnesota, United States is located south of the downtown region of the city.  It is bounded by Lake Street on the north, Chicago Avenue on the east, 38th Street on the south, and Interstate 35W on the west. It should not be confused with the Central community, which covers Downtown and some surrounding neighborhoods.

Developed mostly between 1900 and 1930, the Central neighborhood is racially diverse and has drawn African-American residents since the 1920s.  Until it was closed in 1982 and later razed, Central High School was located here (Prince graduated from Central in 1976).

In 2010, the population of the neighborhood was 8,307. The neighborhood was 21.1% White, 25.1% Black or African American, 2.2% American Indian or Alaska Native, 3.6% Asian or Pacific Islander, 44.3% Hispanic or Latino, 3.4% two or more races, and 0.2% other race. The percentage of households with children was higher than the city average, and the percentage of single households was lower than the city average. The median household income was $36,988, which was $8,637 lower than the city average.

References

External links
Minneapolis Central Neighborhood Official Site
Minneapolis Neighborhood Profile - Central

Neighborhoods in Minneapolis